Pteryx is a genus of beetles.

Pteryx may also refer to:
Pteryx UAV, robotic airplane
"-pteryx", a suffix used in taxonomy
, species of insect